Gdańsk Scientific Society (Polish: Gdańskie Towarzystwo Naukowe, GTN) is a general scientific society in Gdańsk, Poland.

It was established in 1922 as the Society of the Sciences and Arts Friends in Gdańsk (Towarzystwo Przyjaciół Nauki i Sztuki w Gdańsku) and was active till 1939, abolished during World War II, reactivated in 1945, having had its present name since 1956.

Today it has five divisions.

Its main publications include:
 Gdańsk Yearbook (Rocznik Gdański)
 Acta Biologica

References

Scientific societies based in Poland
Polish regional societies
Organisations based in Gdańsk